Mimacraea neurata, the alciope acraea mimic, is a butterfly in the family Lycaenidae. It is found in Guinea, Sierra Leone, Liberia, Ivory Coast, Ghana, Togo, Nigeria, the Republic of the Congo and the Democratic Republic of the Congo. The habitat consists of forests.

References

Butterflies described in 1895
Poritiinae
Butterflies of Africa